Bae Sung-woo (Korean: 탁재훈; born 24 July 1968), better known by his stage name Tak Jae-hoon, is a South Korean singer, actor and entertainer. He first became known for being part of K-pop group Country Kko Kko. He has since made a career as an entertainer on South Korean variety shows.

Discography

Albums

Singles

Filmography

Film

Television series

Television shows

Web show

Hosting

Awards and nominations

Notes

References

External links
 
 

1968 births
K-pop singers
Living people
Singers from Seoul
South Korean male singers
South Korean pop singers
South Korean television presenters
South Korean male film actors
Kookmin University alumni